B19 or B-19 may refer to:

 B19 (New York City bus), serving Brooklyn
 Douglas XB-19, an experimental bomber aircraft
 Parvovirus B19, the virus that causes fifth disease
 Caro–Kann Defence ECO code in chess
 Patient B-19
 Boron-19 (B-19 or 19B), an isotope of boron
 LNER Class B19, classified B2 until 1945